Hasanabad-e Olya (also Romanized as Ḩasanābād-e ‘Olyā; also known as Ḩasanābād) is a village in Zohan Rural District, Zohan District, Zirkuh County, South Khorasan Province, Iran. At the 2006 census, its population was 217, in 52 families.

References 

Populated places in Zirkuh County